Spite Marriage is a 1929 American silent comedy film co-directed by Buster Keaton and Edward Sedgwick and starring Keaton and Dorothy Sebastian. It is the second film Keaton made for MGM and his last silent film, although he had wanted it to be a "talkie" or full sound film. While the production has no recorded dialogue, it does feature an accompanying synchronized score and recorded laughter, applause and other sound effects in some scenes. Keaton later wrote gags for some up-and-coming MGM stars like Red Skelton, and from this film recycled many gags, some shot-for-shot, for Skelton's 1943 film I Dood It.

Plot

Elmer, a humble worker in a dry cleaning establishment, idolizes stage actress Trilby Drew. He goes to see her performances all the time, pretending to be a wealthy admirer.

Trilby is in love with fellow actor Lionel Benmore. When Lionel temporarily spurns her for the younger Ethyl Norcrosse, she impulsively asks Elmer to marry her. Her manager, worried about the damage it would do to her career if it got out that she had married a pants presser, tells Elmer the next day that she wants out of the marriage. 

Elmer gets into an altercation with Benmore, eventually punching him. Benmore gets the police to chase him. During the pursuit, Elmer gets into a taxi with an armed gunman. After the driver flees, the crook forces Elmer to drive the taxi into the ocean. He is rescued by a passing ship. 

Wanting to have nothing more to do with Trilby, Elmer gets a job on the ship. However, it turns out that she and Benmore are passengers. When the engine room catches fire, the order is given to abandon ship. Trilby is knocked unconscious when Benmore panics, and is left behind. Elmer manages to put out the fire, leaving him and Trilby alone aboard. The ship is then taken over by crooks. When Trilby is discovered by their lecherous leader, Elmer has to take on the entire gang to save her. He returns to port in triumph. He sees Trilby home and starts to leave, but she stops him, having seen his true worth.

Cast
 Buster Keaton as Elmer (Gantry)
 Dorothy Sebastian	as Trilby Drew
 Edward Earle as Lionel Benmore
 Leila Hyams as Ethyl Norcrosse
 William Bechtel as Nussbaum
 John Byron as Scarzi
 Joe Bordeaux as Rumrunner (uncredited)
 Ray Cooke as The Bellboy (uncredited)
 Mike Donlin as Man in Ship's Engine Room (uncredited)
 Pat Harmon as Tugboat Captain (uncredited)
 Sydney Jarvis as Man in Audience Next to Elmer (uncredited)
 Theodore Lorch as Actor as 'Union Officer' (uncredited)
 Hank Mann as Stage Manager (uncredited)
 Charles Sullivan as Tough Sailor (uncredited)

Production
In its September 12, 1928 issue, the widely read entertainment paper Variety announced, "Buster Keaton's next, 'Spite Marriage', will also have dialog", while Exhibitors Daily Review also reported the same day that "Buster Keaton will do his initial speaking in 'Spite Marriage'". Despite those announcements by popular, well-connected trade publications, the film was destined from pre-production to be a silent offering from MGM, at least one without any recorded dialogue. The studio's head of production, Irving Thalberg, opposed Keaton's plans to make the film his first "talkie". Thalberg had both financial and technical reasons for rejecting any proposals by Keaton or others to apply full-sound to the planned comedy. For one, in the fall of 1928, during that transition period into sound, MGM had at its disposal only one set of recording equipment. Secondly, but more importantly, MGM's executive believed that adding the complications and expense of such a new technology to Keaton's film would significantly increase overall production costs, especially for a performer like Buster whose creativity thrived on "time-consuming improvisations" and a high degree of flexibility while shooting. Thalberg therefore insisted on technical simplicity and close script and set supervision of Keaton's second project for the studio to reduce delays and to increase potential profits for the final product.

According to the American Film Institute's catalog, production work on the film started on November 14, 1928, a date generally consistent with a November 27 report in Exhibitors Herald and Motion Picture World, which announces that Keaton began work on the film "last week".

News updates about the film in 1928 trade publications indicate that casting was still being finalized in the latter half of November. Exhibitors Daily Review announced on November 16, "Dorothy Sebastian has been given the feminine lead opposite Buster Keaton"; and on November 23, "Edward [E]arle is playing the heavy in Buster Keaton's picture, 'Spite Marriage.'" A week later, The Distributor, a paper published by MGM's sales department, confirmed that the studio had assigned Leila Hyams a "big part" in "the forthcoming Buster Keaton vehicle" in part due to her "distinct success" as a lead in the studio's recent crime drama Alias Jimmy Valentine, which had been released just two weeks earlier. The studio publication in the same news item also confirmed that Sydney Jarvis and Hank Mann had joined the cast, although their roles would be uncredited on the screen.

Reception
Spite Marriage in 1929 was generally very well received by critics in leading newspapers, by reviewers in the film industry's major trade journals and papers, as well as by moviegoers. The influential critic for The New York Times, Mordaunt Hall, comments about the audience's response to the comedy in his assessment of the film. He notes that Keaton created "a state of high glee" in the Capitol Theatre in Manhattan, where Hall attended the comedy's premiere on March 25, adding "there were waves of laughter from top to bottom of the house." Abel Green, the editor and reviewer for Variety, characterizes Keaton's production as "replete with belly laffs" and also describes the Capitol's audience being in "hysterics" and "mirthful" while watching it. While Green does express some reservations about what he viewed as several of the film's implausible situations and its "mechanized" structure, he predicts nothing but financial success for the "enjoyable low comedy glorified slapsticker."

The trade paper The Film Daily rated the MGM feature as "the funniest film released in months". In its March 31 review, the paper praises the film and draws special attention to Sebastian's performance: After seeing a preview of Spite Marriage weeks before its premiere in New York, reviewer Walter R. Greene of the trade journal Motion Picture News, praised the feature even more than The Film Daily, judging Keaton's work to be not only his best film "since he graduated from the two reel ranks" but also "one of the best pieces of comedy business ever developed in a picture". Comparing Spite Marriage to Charlie Chaplin's The Gold Rush (1925), Greene in his review states, "The picture is packed with laughs" and reports that the sequence in which Keaton puts his intoxicated wife to bed evoked from the audience "a continual roar for over half a reel." Photoplay, the nation's leading movie-fan magazine of the period, only added to the accolades and endorsements that the film received in 1929. In its April issue, the magazine labels the film "hilarious", "intense", and "Chaplinesque". Then, in May, Photoplay provides another, more succinct review to its large readership: "One of the best Buster Keaton has made, with Dorothy Sebastian excellent. Don't miss."

References and notes

See also
 Buster Keaton filmography

External links

 
 
 
 
 Spite Marriage at the International Buster Keaton Society

1929 films
1929 romantic comedy films
American romantic comedy films
American silent feature films
American black-and-white films
Films directed by Buster Keaton
Films directed by Edward Sedgwick
Metro-Goldwyn-Mayer films
Silent romantic comedy films
1920s American films
Silent American comedy films